Dixon Township is one of twenty-two townships in Lee County, Illinois, USA.  As of the 2010 census, its population was 17,993 and it contained 7,283 housing units.

History
Dixon Township was established on November 6, 1849.  Two additional townships were created from it; Nelson Township was created on February 28, 1860, and South Dixon Township was created on February 12, 1867.

Geography

Cities, towns, villages
 Dixon (north three-quarters)

Cemeteries
The township contains these five cemeteries: Burket, Chapel Hill, Dixon State School, Mount Union and Oakwood.

Demographics

School districts
 Dixon Unit School District 170

Political districts
 Illinois's 14th congressional district
 State House District 90
 State Senate District 45

References
 
 United States Census Bureau 2010 TIGER/Line Shapefiles
 United States National Atlas

External links
 City-Data.com
 Illinois State Archives
 Township Officials of Illinois

Townships in Lee County, Illinois
Populated places established in 1849
Townships in Illinois
1849 establishments in Illinois